The 3rd United States Congress was a meeting of the legislative branch of the United States federal government, consisting of the United States Senate and the United States House of Representatives. It met at Congress Hall in Philadelphia, Pennsylvania from March 4, 1793, to March 4, 1795, during the fifth and sixth years of George Washington's presidency.

The apportionment of seats in the House of Representatives was governed by the Apportionment Act of 1792 and based on the 1790 Census. The Senate had a Pro-Administration majority, and the House had an Anti-Administration majority.

Major events 

 March 4, 1793: President George Washington begins his second term.
 April 22, 1793: George Washington signed the Neutrality Proclamation
 February 11, 1794: Wishing to avoid charges of being a Star Chamber, the Senate holds its first public session, resolving "That the Senate doors be opened".
 March 14, 1794: Eli Whitney was granted a patent for the cotton gin
 March 27, 1794: The federal government authorized the construction of the original six frigates of the United States Navy
 August 7, 1794: Whiskey Rebellion began: Farmers in the Monongahela Valley of Pennsylvania rebelled against the federal tax on liquor and distilled drinks.
 August 20, 1794: Battle of Fallen Timbers — American troops under General Anthony Wayne forced a confederacy of Shawnee, Mingo, Delaware, Wyandot, Miami, Ottawa, Chippewa and Pottawatomie warriors into a disorganized retreat.

Major legislation 

 January 13, 1794: Flag Act of 1794, Sess. 1, ch. 1, 
 March 22, 1794: Slave Trade Act of 1794, Sess. 1, ch. 11, 
 March 27, 1794: Naval Act of 1794, Sess. 1, ch. 12, 
 January 29, 1795: Naturalization Act of 1795, Sess. 2, ch. 20,

Constitutional amendments 
 March 4, 1794: Approved an amendment to the United States Constitution clarifying judicial power over foreign nationals, and limiting the ability of citizens to sue states in federal courts and under federal law, and submitted it to the state legislatures for ratification .
 February 7, 1795: The 11th Amendment to the United States Constitution was ratified by the requisite number of states (then 12) to become part of the Constitution.

Treaties 
 November 19, 1794: The United States and the Kingdom of Great Britain signed the Jay Treaty, which attempted to clear up some of the lingering problems left over from the American Revolutionary War

Faction summary
There were no political parties in this Congress. Members are informally grouped into factions of similar interest, based on an analysis of their voting record.

Details on changes are shown below in the "Changes in membership" section.

Senate

House of Representatives

Leadership

Senate 

 President: John Adams (P)
 President pro tempore: John Langdon (P), until December 2, 1793
 Ralph Izard (P), May 31, 1794 – November 9, 1794
 Henry Tazewell (P), from February 20, 1795

House of Representatives 
 Speaker: Frederick Muhlenberg (A)

Members 
This list is arranged by chamber, then by state. Senators are listed by class, and representatives are listed by district.
Skip to House of Representatives, below

Senate 
Senators were elected by the state legislatures every two years, with one-third beginning new six-year terms with each Congress. Preceding the names in the list below are Senate class numbers, which indicate the cycle of their election.

Connecticut 
 1. Oliver Ellsworth (P)
 3. Roger Sherman (P), until July 23, 1793
 Stephen Mitchell (P), from December 2, 1793

Delaware 
 1. George Read (P), until September 18, 1793
 Henry Latimer (P), from February 7, 1795
 2. John Vining (P)

Georgia 
 2. James Jackson (A)
 3. James Gunn (A)

Kentucky 
 2. John Brown (A)
 3. John Edwards (A)

Maryland 
 1. Richard Potts (P)
 3. John Henry (P)

Massachusetts 
 1. George Cabot (P)
 2. Caleb Strong (P)

New Hampshire 
 2. Samuel Livermore (P)
 3. John Langdon (A)

New Jersey 
 1. John Rutherfurd (P)
 2. Frederick Frelinghuysen (P)

New York 
 1. Aaron Burr (A)
 3. Rufus King (P)

North Carolina 
 2. Alexander Martin (A)
 3. Benjamin Hawkins (A)

Pennsylvania 
 1. Albert Gallatin (A), until February 28, 1794
 James Ross (P), from April 24, 1794
 3. Robert Morris (P)

Rhode Island 
 1. Theodore Foster (P)
 2. William Bradford (P)

South Carolina 
 2. Pierce Butler (A)
 3. Ralph Izard (P)

Vermont 
 1. Moses Robinson (A)
 3. Stephen R. Bradley (A)

Virginia 
 1. James Monroe (A), until May 27, 1794
 Stevens Mason (A), from November 18, 1794
 2. John Taylor (A), until May 11, 1794
 Henry Tazewell (A), from December 29, 1794

House of Representatives 
The names of members of the House of Representatives are preceded by their district numbers.

Connecticut 
All representatives were elected statewide on a general ticket.
 . Joshua Coit (P)
 . James Hillhouse (P)
 . Amasa Learned (P)
 . Zephaniah Swift (P)
 . Uriah Tracy (P)
 . Jonathan Trumbull Jr. (P)
 . Jeremiah Wadsworth (P)

Delaware 
 . John Patten (A), until February 14, 1794
 Henry Latimer (P), February 14, 1794 – February 7, 1795
 Vacant thereafter

Georgia 
Both representatives were elected statewide on a general ticket.
 . Abraham Baldwin (A)
 . Thomas P. Carnes (A)

Kentucky 
 . Christopher Greenup (A)
 . Alexander D. Orr (A)

Maryland 
 . George Dent (P)
 . John Mercer (A), until April 13, 1794
 Gabriel Duvall (A), from November 11, 1794
 . Uriah Forrest (P), until November 8, 1794
 Benjamin Edwards (P), from January 2, 1795
 . Thomas Sprigg (A)
 . Samuel Smith (A)
 . Gabriel Christie (A)
 . William Hindman (P)
 . William Vans Murray (P)

Massachusetts 
There was a single at-large seat along with four plural districts, each of which had multiple representatives elected at-large on a general ticket.
 . Fisher Ames (P)
 . Samuel Dexter (P)
 . Benjamin Goodhue (P)
 . Samuel Holten (A)
 . Dwight Foster (P)
 . William Lyman (A)
 . Theodore Sedgwick (P)
 . Artemas Ward (P)
 . Shearjashub Bourne (P)
 . Peleg Coffin Jr. (P)
 . Henry Dearborn (A)
 . George Thatcher (P)
 . Peleg Wadsworth (P)
 . David Cobb (P)

New Hampshire 
All representatives were elected statewide on a general ticket.
 . Nicholas Gilman (P)
 . John Sherburne (A)
 . Jeremiah Smith (P)
 . Paine Wingate (P)

New Jersey 
All representatives were elected statewide on a general ticket.
 . John Beatty (P)
 . Elias Boudinot (P)
 . Lambert Cadwalader (P)
 . Abraham Clark (P), until September 15, 1794
 Aaron Kitchell (A), from January 29, 1795
 . Jonathan Dayton (P)

New York 
 . Thomas Tredwell (A)
 . John Watts (P)
 . Philip Van Cortlandt (A)
 . Peter Van Gaasbeck (P)
 . Theodorus Bailey (A)
 . Ezekiel Gilbert (P)
 . John E. Van Alen (P)
 . Henry Glen (P)
 . James Gordon (P)
 . Silas Talbot (P), until June 5, 1794
 Vacant thereafter

North Carolina 
 . Joseph McDowell (A)
 . Matthew Locke (A)
 . Joseph Winston (A)
 . Alexander Mebane (A)
 . Nathaniel Macon (A)
 . James Gillespie (A)
 . William Barry Grove (P)
 . William Johnston Dawson (A)
 . Thomas Blount (A)
 . Benjamin Williams (A)

Pennsylvania 
All representatives were elected statewide on a general ticket.
 . James Armstrong (P)
 . William Findley (A)
 . Thomas Fitzsimons (P)
 . Andrew Gregg (A)
 . Thomas Hartley (P)
 . Daniel Hiester (A)
 . William Irvine (A)
 . John Wilkes Kittera (P)
 . William Montgomery (A)
 . Frederick A. C. Muhlenberg (A)
 . John Peter G. Muhlenberg (A)
 . Thomas Scott (P)
 . John Smilie (A)

Rhode Island 
Both representatives were elected statewide on a general ticket.
 . Benjamin Bourne (P)
 . Francis Malbone (P)

South Carolina 
 . William L. Smith (P)
 . John Hunter (A)
 . Lemuel Benton (A)
 . Richard Winn (A)
 . Alexander Gillon (A), until October 6, 1794
 Robert Goodloe Harper (P), from February 9, 1795
 . Andrew Pickens (A)

Vermont 
 . Israel Smith (A)
 . Nathaniel Niles (A)

Virginia 
 . Robert Rutherford (A)
 . Andrew Moore (A)
 . Joseph Neville (A)
 . Francis Preston (A)
 . George Hancock (P)
 . Isaac Coles (A)
 . Abraham B. Venable (A)
 . Thomas Claiborne (A)
 . William B. Giles (A)
 . Carter B. Harrison (A)
 . Josiah Parker (P)
 . John Page (A)
 . Samuel Griffin (P)
 . Francis Walker (A)
 . James Madison (A)
 . Anthony New (A)
 . Richard Bland Lee (P)
 . John Nicholas (A)
 . John Heath (A)

Non-voting members 
  ("Southwest Territory," later "Tennessee"). James White, seated September 3, 1794

Changes in membership 
The count below reflects changes from the beginning of the first session of this Congress

United States  Senate 
There were 1 death, 3 resigns, 1 late election, and 1 contested election.

|-
| Connecticut(3)
|  | Roger Sherman (P)
| Died July 23, 1793.
|  | Stephen M. Mitchell (P)
| Elected December 2, 1793

|-
| Delaware(1)
|  | George Read (P)
| Resigned on September 18, 1793. Kensey Johns was appointed on March 19, 1794, but not permitted to qualify.
|  | Henry Latimer (P)
| Appointed February 7, 1795

|-
| Pennsylvania(1)
|  | Albert Gallatin (A)
| Credentials were contested and the seat was declared vacant February 28, 1794.
|  | James Ross (P)
| Elected April 24, 1794

|-
| Virginia(1)
|  | James Monroe (A)
| Resigned May 11, 1794, to become United States Minister to France.
|  | Stevens T. Mason (A)
| Elected November 18, 1794

|-
| Virginia(2)
|  | John Taylor (A)
| Resigned May 11, 1794.
|  | Henry Tazewell (A)
| Elected November 18, 1794

|}

House of Representatives 

There were 2 deaths, 3 resignations, and 1 contested election.

|-
| nowrap | 
|  | John Patten (A)
| Contested election; served until February 14, 1794.
|  | Henry Latimer (P)
| Seated February 14, 1794

|-
| nowrap | 
| Vacant
| Delegate seat established.
| James White Non-voting delegate
| Elected September 3, 1794

|-
| nowrap | 
|  | John Francis Mercer (A)
| Resigned April 13, 1794.
|  | Gabriel Duvall (A)
| Seated November 11, 1794

|-
| nowrap | 
|  | Silas Talbot (P)
| Accepted appointment to the U.S. Navy June 5, 1794.
| Vacant
| Not filled in this Congress

|-
| nowrap | 
|  | Abraham Clark (P)
| Died September 15, 1794.
|  | Aaron Kitchell (P)
| Seated January 29, 1795

|-
| nowrap | 
|  | Alexander Gillon (A)
| Died October 6, 1794.
|  | Robert Goodloe Harper (P)
| Seated February 9, 1795

|-
| nowrap | 
|  | Uriah Forrest (P)
| Resigned November 8, 1794.
|  | Benjamin Edwards (P)
| Seated January 2, 1795

|-
| nowrap | 
|  | Henry Latimer (P)
| Resigned February 7, 1795, having been elected U.S. Senator.
| Vacant
| Not filled in this Congress
|}

Committees
Lists of committees and their party leaders.

Senate

 Whole

House of Representatives

 Claims (Chairman: Uriah Tracy)
 Elections (Chairman: William Loughton Smith then Jonathan Dayton)
 Rules (Select) 
 Ways and Means (Chairman: William Loughton Smith)
 Whole

Joint committees

 Enrolled Bills  (Chairman: John Rutherfurd)

Employees 

 Architect of the Capitol: William Thornton

Senate 
 Chaplain: William White (Episcopalian)
 Doorkeeper: James Mathers
 Secretary: Samuel Allyne Otis

House of Representatives 
 Chaplain: Ashbel Green (Presbyterian)
 Clerk: John J. Beckley
 Doorkeeper: Gifford Dalley
 Reading Clerks: 
 Sergeant at Arms: Joseph Wheaton

See also 
 1792 United States elections (elections leading to this Congress)
 1792 United States presidential election
 1792–93 United States Senate elections
 1792–93 United States House of Representatives elections
 1794 United States elections (elections during this Congress, leading to the next Congress)
 1794–95 United States Senate elections
 1794–95 United States House of Representatives elections

Notes

References

External links 
Statutes at Large, 1789-1875
Senate Journal, First Forty-three Sessions of Congress
House Journal, First Forty-three Sessions of Congress
Biographical Directory of the U.S. Congress
U.S. House of Representatives: House History
U.S. Senate: Statistics and Lists